Acacia galeata is a shrub or tree of the genus Acacia and the subgenus Plurinerves that is endemic to an area of western Australia.

Description
Like most species of Acacia it has phyllodes rather than true leaves. The spreading and evergreen phyllodes have a narrowly elliptic to lanceolate shape that are more or less inequilateral and straight to slightly sickle shaped. It blooms from April to June and produces yellow flowers.

Distribution
It is native to an area in the Mid West and Gascoyne regions of Western Australia where it is commonly situated on low rises, undulating plains and coastal areas growing in sandy or loamy soils often over or around limestone. The range of the plant extends from the area around Shark Bay from around Wooramel Station in the north down to around Nerren Nerren Station in the south, it is also found off-shore from the mainland on Dorre Island and Dirk Hartog Island as a part of shrubland and low woodland communities.

See also
 List of Acacia species

References

galeata
Acacias of Western Australia
Taxa named by Bruce Maslin
Plants described in 1983